Jurski Vrh is a settlement in the Municipality of Kungota in the western part of the Slovene Hills in northeastern Slovenia, right on the border with Austria. It includes the hamlet of Jurij ob Pesnici, on the left bank of the Pesnica River, as well as the dispersed houses in the hills north of the village.

Name
The name of the settlement was changed from Sveti Jurij ob Pesnici (literally, 'Saint George on the Pesnica River') to Jurski Vrh (literally, 'George Peak') in 1952. The name was changed on the basis of the 1948 Law on Names of Settlements and Designations of Squares, Streets, and Buildings as part of efforts by Slovenia's postwar communist government to remove religious elements from toponyms.

Church
The parish church, from which the village gets its name, is dedicated to Saint George and belongs to the Roman Catholic Archdiocese of Maribor. It stands in the centre of the village on the north side of the main road. The church was first mentioned in written documents dating to 1383. The current building dates to the 16th century and is a typical example of Gothic architecture of the region with a single nave. It was renovated in the 17th century and in 1855, and contains Baroque internal furnishings. The date 1532 appears on the belfry.

References

External links 

Jurski Vrh on Geopedia

Populated places in the Municipality of Kungota